Earthbound is a Canadian current affairs television series which aired on CBC Television in 1982.

Premise
Fred Langer hosted this series which was focused on issues of Canada's resource-based industries and their ecology. Topics included oil pricing differences between Canada and the United States, renewal in the Atlantic fishing industry, grain transport costs and their consequences for western Canada, and the lack of international competitiveness in the Canadian forestry sector.

Scheduling
This half-hour series was broadcast on Sundays at 1:00 p.m. (Eastern) from 6 June to 19 September 1982.

References

External links
 

CBC Television original programming
1982 Canadian television series debuts
1982 Canadian television series endings
Environment of Canada
1980s Canadian television news shows